For our Future's Sake (FFS) was a student-led pressure group supporting a referendum on the Brexit withdrawal agreement. It represented at least 60 Students’ Unions, and 980,000 students, across the UK.

Background 
FFS was launched at the National Union of Students' National Conference in 2018. Incumbent Deputy President Amatey Doku called for 'nationwide student-led mobilization to demand a people's vote' during his re-election speech, and delegates passed policy to 'campaign for a second referendum on the deal negotiated'.

In May 2018, the campaign launched its statement of intent in an open letter undersigned by 120 student leaders. The letter was featured in several British newspapers, and FFS spokespeople pledged a 'summer of action' involving demonstrations across the UK.

The campaign's style has been described as 'irreverent' and 'provocative', attracting a broad youth appeal through memes, videos and profanity.

Activities 
The organisation has held a number of direct-action demonstrations, including stunts at the Labour Live festival, outside Boris Johnson's residence, and at Parliament. The group also held numerous rallies and demonstrations across the UK during its 'summer of action', attracting over 160,000 attendees; this culminated with a march at Labour's National Conference. It gained endorsements from Dragons' Den star Deborah Meaden and YouTuber Dodie Clark, as well as several MPs. Members of the campaign have been featured on leading news networks, and in national print media and online.

FFS also works closely with Our Future Our Choice (OFOC), another young person's pro-EU advocacy group, collaborating on events like the number of "Parliament Takeovers" where a large group of young people visit Parliament's central lobby and meet with their local MPs.

The primary impact of the group is on the People's Vote campaign itself. Journalist Matthew D'Ancona described the influence of FFS as 'transformative', arguing that 'the public face of People's Vote changed fundamentally as the new network fizzed and buzzed and did its work. A campaign that had started life looking like the liberal elite demanding its job back morphed into a grassroots uprising of the young against their elders.'

Membership 
FFS supporters include sabbatical officers in 2018 from Students' Unions in Birmingham, Cambridge, Leeds, and Liverpool, as well as across Scotland, Wales and Northern Ireland.

Higher Education members 
See List of Higher Education students' unions in the United Kingdom

Scotland 

 Aberdeen University Students Union
 Highlands and Islands Students' Association
 Heriot-Watt University Students' Union
 St Andrews Students' Association
 Strathclyde Students' Union
 West Scotland Students' Association

England 

 Bath Students' Union
 Bath Spa University Students' Union
 Birkbeck Students' Union
 University of Birmingham Guild of Students
 Cambridge University Graduate Union
 Cambridge University Students' Union
 Chester Students' Union
 Coventry Students' Union
 Edge Hill Students' Union
 Falmouth and Exeter Students' Union
 Gloucestershire Students' Union
 Hull University Union
 Keele Students' Union
 Kent University Union
 Lancaster University Students' Union
 Law Student Association
 Leeds University Union
 Leicester Students' Union
 Lincoln Students' Union
 Liverpool John Moore's Students' Union
 London Metropolitan Students' Union
 London South Bank Students' Union
 Middlesex Students' Union
 Nottingham Students' Union
 Northumbria Students' Union
 Norwich University of the Arts Students' Union
 Plymouth Students' Union
 Roehampton Students' Union
 Sheffield Hallam Students' Union
 Staffordshire Students' Union
 Surrey Students' Union
 Teesside University Students' Union
 West London Students' Union
 Westminster Students' Union
 Worcester Students' Union

Wales 
 Aberystwyth Students' Union
 Swansea University Students' Union
 Trinity St Davids Students' Union

Northern Ireland 
 Queen's University Belfast Students' Union
 Ulster University Students Union

Further Education members 

 Ayrshire College Students' Union
 Bath College Students' Union
 Chichester College
 City of Liverpool College Students' Union
 Coleg Cambria
 Derby College
 Dudley College
 Exeter College
 Furness College
 Grŵp Llandrillo Menai
 Havant and South Downs College
 Newcastle Under Lyme College Students' Union

National affiliates 
 National Union of Students
 Labour Students
 Young Greens

References 

2018 establishments in the United Kingdom
2018 in British politics
Brexit–related advocacy groups in the United Kingdom
Consequences of the 2016 United Kingdom European Union membership referendum
Lobbying organisations in the United Kingdom
United Kingdom and the European Union
2016 United Kingdom European Union membership referendum
Pro-Europeanism in the United Kingdom